Eureka High School (commonly called Eureka High or EHS) is a public secondary school in Eureka, Illinois, United States. The school is part of Eureka Community Unit District 140, with admission based primarily on the locations of students' homes. Communities supported include Eureka, Goodfield, Secor, and Congerville. Serving students in grades ninth grade–twelfth grade, it is a small high school with a student base of 504 students. The school is a member of the Heart of Illinois Conference and competes under the name Hornets.

Awards and Distinctions 
21 Illinois State Scholars

2014 ACT Red Quill Award for Excellence

2014 Nationally Ranked High School by US News

IHSA State Trophies in

 Scholastic Bowl, Boys & Girls Cross Country, Volleyball, Girls Track, Baseball, Boys & Girls Track, Basketball

Notable alumni
 Dan McCoy (born 1978), comedian and television writer, is a 1996 graduate of Eureka High School
 Andy Studebaker (born 1985; class of 2004) — NFL linebacker for the Indianapolis Colts, is a 2004 graduate of Eureka High School
 Ben Zobrist (born 1981; class of 2001) — All-Star Major League Baseball  was raised near Eureka

Notable faculty
 Kenny Robertson, mixed martial artist and shop teacher

References

External links
 

Public high schools in Illinois
Schools in Woodford County, Illinois